Home Forward, established in 1941 as the Housing Authority of Portland, is a housing authority that serves Portland, Oregon, and nearby municipalities in Multnomah County, Oregon, United States. Home Forward maintains properties in Portland, Gresham, and Fairview.

History
The Housing Authority of Portland (HAP) was created by the Portland City Council on December 11, 1941. The city council created the agency in response to a massive influx of people who came to work at shipyards in the Portland area during World War II. HAP developed many housing projects over the course of the war (not including Vanport which was developed by Kaiser, a private shipbuilder) Guild's Lake Courts, and Columbia Villa. By 1942, HAP developments housed approximately 72,000 people, making HAP the largest housing authority in the United States.

HAP started using the name "Home Forward" in May 2011.

Governance
Home Forward is led by a nine-member board of commissioners. All board members are volunteers who serve staggered four-year terms. Four commissioners are recommended by the City of Portland, two are recommended by the City of Gresham, two are recommended by Multnomah County, and one is recommended by the residents of Home Forward developments. The recommended board members are appointed by the Mayor of Portland and confirmed by the Portland City Council.

See also
 Louisa Flowers, the namesake of a housing development by Home Forward

References

Further reading

External links

 
 "Housing Authority of Portland" in The Oregon Encyclopedia

1941 establishments in Oregon
Government agencies established in 1941
Government of Portland, Oregon
Housing organizations